The Minister for Defence is the principal minister responsible for the organisation, implementation, and formulation of government policy in defence and military matters for the Australian Government. The individual who holds this office directs the government’s approach to such matters through the Australian Defence Organisation and, by extension, the Department of Defence and the Australian Defence Force. The office of the Minister for Defence, like all Cabinet positions, is not referenced in the Constitution of Australia but rather exists through convention and the prerogative of the Governor-General to appoint ministers of state.

As the Minister for Defence is responsible for the executive management of Australia's defence and military forces and the portfolio's accountability to the Parliament, the Secretary of Defence is required under section 63(1) of the Public Service Act 1999 and the Requirements for Annual Reports from the Parliamentary Joint Committee on Public Accounts and Audit to submit a report to the responsible ministers on the activities of the Department of Defence after the end of each financial year for presentation to the Parliament.

It is one of only four ministerial positions (along with Prime Minister, Attorney-General and Treasurer) that have existed since Federation.

Defence policy
The primary function of the Minister for Defence is to direct the formulation of the government's defence policy relating to the universal conduct of any entity of the Australian Government, or working on behalf of the Australian Government, and the agencies and personnel of the Australian Defence Organisation as a whole. The Australian Government operates three principal entities responsible for creating and maintaining defence policy within the 'Defence' superstructure: the Air Power Development Centre, Australian Strategic Policy Institute, and Sea Power Centre - Australia. Additionally, the Australian Government, often at the direct request of the Prime Minister, will expend extensive introspective resources for the publication of Defence white papers so as to assess the current extent of Australia's defence capabilities and infrastructure and investigate the best manner of improving Defence in such a way that will positively inform the government's policy.

The most recent white paper publication is the 2016 Defence White Paper that includes three elements: the 2016 Defence White Paper itself, 2016 Integrated Investment Program, and 2016 Defence Industry Policy Statement. Presented on 24 February 2016 and published the same day, it is the eighth defence whitepaper since 1976 and defined three key strategic objectives that the defence portfolios and governments of both parties have had little debate over. Recent Ministers for Defence for both political parties have typically formed their policy around the strict and professional advice of Australia's leading policy experts and senior military personnel and has generally caused little controversy.

Composition of the defence portfolio
Over the years there have been a number of ministers with a variety of functions involved in the defence portfolio; in the period November 1939 to April 1942, there was no position named "Minister of Defence". Instead, several ministers were responsible for the various tasks and duties that are presently under the purview of the Minister for Defence.

Previous governments have included ministers with titles using one or more of the following terms:

Air
Aircraft production
Army
Defence
Defence Coordination
Defence Industry
Defence Materiel
Defence Personnel
Defence Production
Defence Science
Defence Support
Development
Munitions
Navy
Repatriation
Shipping
Supply
Veterans' Affairs

List of ministers for defence
There was a Minister for Defence from 1 January 1901 until 13 November 1939, with the exception of two small breaks. Robert Menzies, the Prime Minister, abolished the position on the outbreak of World War II and created separate Ministers for the Navy, the Army and the Air, with himself as Minister for Defence Coordination in his first ministry. He retained this position until the fall of his government, and then held the post in the brief government of Arthur Fadden. John Curtin initially followed the same arrangement as Menzies in his ministry until 14 April 1942, when he took the title of Minister for Defence. The separate titles of Ministers for the Navy, the Army and the Air were abolished in the second Whitlam Ministry on 30 November 1973, when the separate departments of Navy, Army and Air were also abolished. There had also been a separate Navy portfolio between 1915 and 1921.

The following have served as Minister for Defence:

List of assistant ministers for defence
The following individuals have been appointed as Assistant Minister for Defence, or any of its precedent titles:

Individual service branch ministers

Ministers for the Navy
The following served as Minister for the Navy:

Ministers for the Army
The following served as Minister for the Army:

Ministers for Air
The following served as Minister for Air:

See also

 Department of Defence (Australia)
 Department of Munitions (11 June 1940 — April 1948)
 Minister for Defence Industry
 Minister for Defence Personnel
 Minister for Veterans' Affairs (Australia)

Notes

References

External links

 

Defence
Military of Australia